Harvey Leibenstein (1922 – February 28, 1994) was a Ukrainian-born American economist. One of his most important contributions to economics was the concept of X-inefficiency and the critical minimum effort thesis in development economics.

Concerning his "critical minimum effort thesis", he says that the underdeveloped countries are trapped by the vicious circle of poverty and many other growth retarding factors which keep them in the state of backwardness. So these countries need to increase their per capita income to a certain level where they can maintain a self-sustained growth rate: they need a critical minimum effort, i.e., they need to invest at more than a minimum level to overcome all the obstacles of the underdeveloped countries.

In economics, X-efficiency is the effectiveness with which a given set of inputs are used to produce outputs. If a firm is producing the maximum output it can, given the resources it employs, such as men and machinery, and the best technology available, it is said to be technical-efficient. X-inefficiency occurs when technical-efficiency is not achieved.

The concept of X-efficiency is also used in the theory of bureaucracy.

Selected publications

 1950, "Bandwagon, Snob and Veblen Effects in the Theory of Consumer Demand", Quarterly Journal of Economics, Vol.64 No.2 : Page 183-207
 1954, A Theory of Economic-Demographic Development, Foreword by Frank Notestein, Princeton, New Jersey: Princeton University Press
  1960, "Economic Backwardness and Economic Growth: Studies in the Theory of Economic Development",
 1966, Allocative Efficiency vs. "X-Efficiency", The American Economic Review, Vol. LVI., June 1966
 1968, Entrepreneurship and Development, The American Economic Review, 58(2):72–83
 1969, Organizational or Frictional Equilibria, The Quarterly Journal of Economics, Vol. LXXXIII, No. 4, November 1969.
 1974, Socio-economic Fertility Theories and Their Relevance to Population Policy, International Labour Review, May/June 1974.
 1974, An Interpretation of the Economic Theory of Fertility, Journal of Economic Literature, Vol. XII, No. 2, June 1974.
 1975, The Economic Theory of Fertility Decline, The Quarterly Journal of Economics, Vol LXXXIX, No. 1, February 1975.
 1976, Beyond Economic Man, Cambridge: Harvard: University Press
 1978, General X-Efficiency Theory and Economic Development, New York: Oxford University Press
 1978, "'X-inefficiency Exists: A Reply to an Exorcist," American Economic Review, 68 (1978): 208
 1979, "A Branch of Economics Is Missing: Micro-Micro Theory," Journal of Economic Literature, 17: 477-502 
 1979, “The General X-Efficiency Paradigm and the Role of the Entrepreneur”. in: Mario Rizzo (ed.), Time, Uncertainty, and Disequilibrium. Lexington: Heath 1979, 127-139
 1982, “The Prisoners’s Dilemma in the Invisible Hand: An Analysis of Intrafirm Productivity.” American Economic Review, (Papers and Proceedings) 72, no. 2 (May): 92–7
 1983, "Property Rights and X-Efficiency: Comment." American Economic Review, 83: 831–42.
 1987, Inside the Firm, The Inefficiencies of Hierarchy, Cambridge: Harvard University Press

References

External links
 https://www.nytimes.com/1994/03/03/obituaries/harvey-leibenstein-harvard-professor-71.html

1922 births
1994 deaths
American people of Ukrainian-Jewish descent
20th-century American economists
Soviet emigrants to the United States